Rakovice refers to:

 Rakovice, Piešťany District, village and municipality in Piešťany District, Slovakia
 Rakovice (Písek District), village and municipality in Písek District, Czech Republic